Marina Picasso (born 14 November 1950) is the granddaughter of Pablo Picasso. She inherited a fifth of her grandfather's estate and has used much of the inheritance to fund humanitarian efforts for children in need. She has five children and lives in Geneva, Switzerland and Cannes, France.

Early life 
Marina was born in 1950 to Emiliénne Lotte May and Paulo Picasso. Paulo was the son of a Russian ballerina Olga Khokhlova and artist Pablo Picasso. Her brother Pablito was born a year earlier on May 5, 1949. 

Marina's father Paulo worked odd jobs for Pablo Picasso (such as a chauffeur), and did not spend a lot of time with his immediate family. Consequently, Marina's parents divorced in 1953, three years after she was born. Paulo remarried Christine Pauplin and they had a son, Bernard Ruiz-Picasso.

Emiliénne did not work and, "relied on handouts from her ex-husband to raise Marina and her older brother, Pablito." Paulo did not work regularly, so Marina and her brother grew up in poverty despite her grandfather's proximity and enormous wealth.

In 1957, Pablo Picasso sued unsuccessfully for custody of Marina and Pablito on the grounds that their environment was “degrading to their health and morality.” He did not succeed, but he did become more involved in their lives by paying for their school. However, he paid for room and board only so, the children struggled to pay for books and "could afford neither school trips nor proper clothes."

Marina wanted to go to college and medical school but could not pay for it. Instead, she supported herself by working in a home for children with mental health issues and learning disabilities.

Picasso's death and inheritance  

Pablo Picasso died in Mougins, France on April 8, 1973. Picasso's second wife Jacqueline did not allow Marina's brother Pablito to attend the funeral; a few days later, he drank a bottle of bleach. As a result, Pablito suffered from internal injuries for three months before dying on July 2, 1973.  

Despite the wealth Pablo Picasso left behind, the immediate family could not afford Pablito's funeral, so the burial expenses were paid for with donations from friends. 

Picasso did not leave a will, which caused years of fighting between his widow, mistresses, children and grandchildren. After a judge sorted out the details of the inheritance, Marina Picasso inherited a fifth of the estate. Her portion consisted of over 10,000 pieces of art and Picasso's Cannes residence, Villa La Californie.

Humanitarian work 

Marina has slowly worked to sell her vast Picasso collection to pay for her charitable causes. Until his death in 2008, she worked with gallery representative Jan Krugier. When Krugier died, she tried to sell through Sotheby's but wasn't happy with the results. Since 2013, Marina has been selling privately. She said, "...helping to look after orphaned children or suffering adolescents and surrounding them with affection has been a constant aim of my life." 

In 1990, through her charitable company, the Marina Picasso Foundation, she founded an orphanage in a former military base in Thu Duc, Vietnam. The orphanage was called "The Village of Youth." Marina’s foundation also funded well digging in Vietnam, sent food to orphanages, purchased medical equipment for hospitals and gave out farming subsidies and scholarships. She has donated to various charities in countries around the world, including Vietnam, Switzerland, France, and various African countries.

Personal life 

Marina Picasso has five children: Gael, Flore, Dimitri, Florian, and May. Dimitri, Florian, and May were adopted from Vietnam. Florian Picasso is a DJ and music producer. Marina has never been 
married.

Published work 
 Picasso, Marina. (1995). Les enfants du bout du monde. Paris: Ramsay.
 Picasso, Marina, & Valentin, L. (2001). Picasso, My Grandfather. New York, NY: Riverhead Books.

References 

French women writers
French humanitarians
Women humanitarians
1950 births
Living people
Pablo Picasso